Cognac Public Garden is located in of the heart of the town of Cognac in the departement of Charente, France.  It is one of the few English-styled gardens in France open to the general public.  The park is the result of the marriage of the gardens of two adjoining properties; it houses the Hotel de Ville (Town Hall) and the Museum of Art and History.

History 

The mansion known as Otard La Grange is purchased by the commune in 1889, the Hotel de Ville was installed there in 1892.  In the meantime architect Alfred Leroux redeveloped the building and added a bell tower and monumental staircase, whilst landscape architect Édouard André redesigned the park into a sunken garden and added several water features.

In 1921, the Dupuy d'Angeac mansion is purchased and turned into the museum based on designs by Antoine Raymond Clavery. He also creates a natural amphitheatre by taking advantage of the natural undulation of the landscape and joins the two gardens together. He retains the style of Edouard Andre, albeit with narrow alley ways and no further major prospect. In 1943, the garden is classified.

The great storm of December 1999 results in the destruction of 288 trees out of 720.  The opportunity is taken to rehabilitate the garden under the direction of landscape architect Jean-François Galinette, who bases his designs on those of Clavery and André.

Description 
The park occupies an area of seven hectares.  From the main entrance the view extends over a broad perspective towards the monumental staircase of the Hotel de Ville. On the right, ducks and swans swim in the water below; a continuation of a maze of landscaped rivers and waterfalls.

Gardens in Charente